Baturyn, is a historic city in Chernihiv Oblast (province) of northern Ukraine. It is located in Nizhyn Raion (district) on the banks of the Seym River. Baturyn lost its city status in 1923 and received it back only in 2008. It hosts the administration of Baturyn urban hromada, one of the hromadas of Ukraine. Population:

History
Evidence of settlement in the area of present-day Baturyn dates back to the Neolithic era, with digging having also revealed Bronze Age and Scythian remains. According to some modern writers, the earliest fortress at Baturyn would have been created by the Grand Principality of Chernihiv in the 11th century. The contemporary name for the settlement, however, was first mentioned in the 1625, likely referring to the fortress of Stefan Batory (1533-1586, King of Poland, Prince of Transylvania, and Grand Duke of Lithuania), which was built and named in his honor. 

The area had been part of the Polish–Lithuanian Commonwealth (in the Kijów Voivodeship (Kyiv) of the Crown of Poland) since before the Union of Lublin of 1569. Control of the town was wrested away from the Commonwealth by Ukrainian forces during the Khmelnytsky Uprising of 1648–1657, when natives of Ruthenia gained some degree of autonomy under Hetman Bohdan Khmelnytsky (1595-1657) and his Cossack state. In 1648 Baturyn was transformed into a Cossack regional center (sotnia), first hosting the Starodub Cossack Regiment and then the Nizhyn Regiment.

By 1654 Baturyn, home to 486 cossacks and 274 villagers, was granted Magdeburg Rights. As the settlement grew, more merchants flocked to it, and great fairs took place quarterly. The capital of the Cossack Hetmanate (an autonomous Cossack republic in Left-bank Ukraine) was located in Baturyn from 1669 to 1708 and from 1750 to 1764. In Baturyn Hetman Ivan Briukhovetsky signed the Baturyn Statutes in 1663, which further elaborated the treaty with the Tsardom of Russia which Khmelnytsky had initiated with the Treaty of Pereyaslav in 1654.

The area prospered under the rule of Hetman Ivan Mazepa (1687–1708), increasing in size and population (with upwards of 20,000 residents). Baturyn boasted 40 churches and chapels, two monasteries and a college for government officials and diplomats (the Kantseliarsky Kurin). In 1708 the Zaporozhian Cossacks became involved in the Great Northern War. Hetman Mazepa, after realizing that the Russians planned to remove him from power, switched his allegiance to Sweden (then at war with the Russian Empire) and began to place more emphasis on Ukraine's independence. 

On 13 November 1708 a Russian army under the command of Alexander Menshikov sacked and razed Baturyn and slaughtered all of its inhabitants in a punitive response. The Russians broke , the commanding officer of the Baturin garrison, on the wheel. Historian Serhiy Pavlenko estimates that Menshikov's army murdered 6 to 7.5 thousand civilians and 5 to 6.5 thousand military personnel. In 1708 the city had had a population of 20,000; by 1726 it had become a ghost town.

The town was rebuilt in the 1750s, and served as the capital for Hetman Count Kirill Razumovsky (in office 1750-1764). Andrey Kvasov designed Razumovsky's palace in the Baroque style (later Charles Cameron rebuilt it in the Neoclassical style in 1799–1803). The home of the famous Cossack Vasyl Kochubey ( 1640-1708), constructed some 50 years earlier, is surrounded today by a park in his name (although hostilities devastated this building during World War II, it was restored during Soviet times).

Following the death of Hetman Razumovsky (1803) the town lost most of its political stature. In 1756 a textile plant was founded with 12 weaving machines. It quickly grew to include 76 machines. When Russian empress Catherine II (reigned 1762-1796) abolished the Ukrainian Cossack state and incorporated its territories into the Russian Empire, Baturyn continued manufacturing textiles, feeding a growing demand for carpets. In 1843 Taras Shevchenko stayed in the town, using his time to paint many of the architectural sights.

In June 1993 the Ukrainian government declared Baturyn the center of a national site of Ukrainian history and culture. In August 2002, at the prodding of President Viktor Yushchenko, a government program was approved to restore Baturyn to its former glory.

On 22 January 2009 Ukraine's President Viktor Yushchenko officially opened the "Hetmans' Capital" monumental complex (including the newly renovated Razumovsky Palace).

Until 18 July 2020, Baturyn belonged to Bakhmach Raion. The raion was abolished in July 2020 as part of the administrative reform of Ukraine, which reduced the number of raions of Chernihiv Oblast to five. The area of Bakhmach Raion was merged into Nizhyn Raion.

Kyrylo Rozumovskyi Palace

The Hetman palace of Kyrylo Rozumovskyi is the main adornment and the central feature of Baturyn (Chernigiv region, Ukraine). K. Rozumovskyi decided to transfer the capital of the Hetmanate (Ukrainian Cossack State) from Glukhiv to Baturyn town soon after being elected the hetman of Ukraine. Baturyn was re-established as capital and Rozumovskyi rebuilt the town and ushered in a brief renaissance. He established the manufacturing of carpets, broadcloth, silk, candles, bricks, and cocklestove tiles, and a stud-farm, a parish school, and a hospital. Hetman also planned to set up a university there.

His intention to gain more autonomy for Ukraine triggered imperial wrath. He was removed from his post of Ukraine's hetman in 1764. Only in 1794 he returned to Baturyn and decided to establish a grandiose palace and a park ensemble. For that purpose he invited the Scottish architect Charles Cameron, whose architectural designs were much appreciated by the Russian Empress Catherine II. 

Cameron was the chief architect of palaces in Tsarskoye Selo, Pavlovsk and others. The only creation of Charles Cameron in Ukraine is this Palace and park ensemble of K. Rozumovskyi in Baturyn.

During 1799–1803 the construction of this historical complex was performed in accordance with his design: the 3-storeyed Palace, constructed in the classicism style and 2 outbuildings, located on both sides of it, as well as a great park around them.

In 1803 after the death of K. Rozumovskyi everything was changed. The decoration works were stopped, and the palace was abandoned. The fire of 1824 ruined practically all its interior decorations. 

The issue of the palace restoration was raised in 1908 at the XIV All-Russian Archaeological Convention. 

Since 1911 the palace was under the guardianship of the “Society for Preservation and Protection of the Architectural and Ancient Monuments in Russia”. The great grandson of K. Rozumovskyi, Kamil Lvovych Rozumovskyi, visited Baturyn in 1909. He donated money for the palace restoration with the desire to settle a Folk Art Museum there. An architect from Petersburg Oleksandr Bilogrud worked out the design of restoration, and guided the restoration works till 1913. 

Further tragic events, WW I and the Bolshevik revolution of 1917 put the restoration aside for a long period of time. The building suffered a lot in the fire of 1923. The outbuildings were completely ruined at the beginning of the 20th century. During World War II the facade walls and the decoration elements of the palace were seriously damaged. The second half of the 20th century has seen several restoration attempts, which preserved the state of the palace, though none of them was completed.

In 2002, under the initiative of V. Yushchenko, then the Prime-Minister of Ukraine, “The Comprehensive Programme On “Hetman’s Capital” Monuments’ Preservation" was developed. The realization of this Programme started in 2003. The volume of works increased considerably in 2005 – after Ukrainian philanthropists donated money for restoration, and the works for the palace and outbuildings’ restoration were conducted in 2005–2006. 

In 2007–2008 the State Budget spent significant sums on it as well. A large amount of work was performed in 2008 and for the first time in its history the Palace obtained its original state. The palace was opened on August 22, 2009. The descendant Gregor Rozumovskyi was invited with his family on the ceremony of the grand  opening and he presented the priceless heirloom – a broadsword of Hetman Kyrylo Rozumovskyi. 
 
The imposing Hetman palace in all its beauty can compete with the most distinguished palaces of the world. The restorers of the palace managed to recreate the authentic greatness of the palace, saving the concept for one from the best architects of that time, Charles Cameron. The restorers recreated the modelling and decoration of the walls, filled the interiors with paintings of Ukrainian hetmans, exclusive chandeliers, floors of palace and artistic parquet. 

Dancing halls were reconstructed true to their former greatness and grandiosity in the atmosphere of the 19th century. The classical music, performed on the old grand piano, conducts the excursions.  Nowadays the palace of Kyrylo Rozumovskyi is the excellent and remarkable place for different concerts, theatrical performance and weddings.

See also
 Hetman of Zaporizhian Host
 Hetman's Capital
 House of Judge General Vasyl Kochubey
 Citadel of Baturyn Fortress
 Sack of Baturyn

References
 (1972) Історіа міст і сіл Української CCP – Чернігівська область (History of Towns and Villages of the Ukrainian SSR – Chernihiv Oblast), Kiev.

External links
 Baturyn article in Encyclopedia of Ukraine
 Mezentsev, Dr. Volodymyr: "Baturyn: historic capital of the Kozak Hetman state," in The Ukrainian Weekly on March 3, 2003
 Baturyn coat of arms (17th Century)

  Baturyn at Castles of Ukraine
  Постанова Кабінету Міністрів України від 14 червня 1993 р. №445 «Про державний історико-культурний заповідник "Гетьманська столиця"» (Decision of the Cabinet of Ministers of Ukraine from June 14, 1993 No. 445 "On the State Historical-Cultural Site 'Hetman Capital'")
  Постанова Кабінету Міністрів України від 17 серпня 2002 р. №1123 «Про затвердження Комплексної програми збереження пам'яток Державного історико-культурного заповідника "Гетьманська столиця" і розвитку соціальної та інженерно-транспортної інфраструктури смт Батурина (Decision of the Cabinet of Ministers of Ukraine from August 17, 2002 No. 1123 "On the Approval of the Complex Program of Protecting Monuments from the State Historical-Cultural Site 'Hetman Capital' and the Development of Social and the Engineering-Transportation Infrastructure of the Town of Baturyn)
 Rozumovskyi Palace/ website of "Hack writers"

 
Cities in Chernihiv Oblast
Konotopsky Uyezd
Chernihiv Voivodeship
Former capitals of Ukraine
Cities of district significance in Ukraine
Blackboard places